Blességué is a town in northern Ivory Coast. It is a sub-prefecture of Kouto Department in Bagoué Region, Savanes District.

Blességué was a commune until March 2012, when it became one of 1126 communes nationwide that were abolished.

In 2014, the population of the sub-prefecture of Blességué was 15,187.

Villages
The 9 villages of the sub-prefecture of Blességué and their population in 2014 are:
 Blessegue (5 524)
 Bougoula (232)
 Gbini (394)
 Kakorogo (877)
 Portio (2 557)
 Sanaoule (1 201)
 Singo (2 320)
 Tiana (560)
 Tiogo (1 522)

Notes

Sub-prefectures of Bagoué
Former communes of Ivory Coast